Meretz is a left-wing political party in Israel. The party was formed in 1992 by the merger of Ratz, Mapam and Shinui, and was at its peak between 1992 and 1996 when it had 12 seats. It currently has no seats in the Knesset, following its failure to pass the electoral threshold in the 2022 elections.

Meretz is a social-democratic and secular party emphasising a two-state solution to the Israeli–Palestinian conflict, social justice, human rights (especially for religious, ethnic and sexual minorities), religious freedom and environmentalism. The party is a member of the Progressive Alliance and Socialist International, and is an observer member of the Party of European Socialists.

History

Meretz was formed prior to the 1992 Israeli legislative election by an alliance of three left-wing political parties, Ratz, Mapam and Shinui, and was initially led by Ratz's chairwoman and long-time Knesset member Shulamit Aloni. The name "Meretz" was chosen as an acronym for Mapam and Ratz. The third party of the alliance wasn't reflected in its name, but was instead mentioned in the party's campaign slogan: "" (A government with vigor [Meretz], the strength to make the change [Shinui]). Its first electoral test was a success, with the party winning twelve seats, making it the third-largest in the Knesset. Meretz became the major coalition partner of Yitzhak Rabin's Labor Party, helping pave the way for the Oslo Accords. The party also picked up several ministerial portfolios; Aloni was made Minister of Education, though disputes over the role of religion in education meant she was moved out of the education ministry to become Minister Without Portfolio in May 1993. In June 1993, she became Minister of Communications and Minister of Science and Technology, a role that was later renamed Minister of Science and the Arts. Amnon Rubinstein became Minister of Energy and Infrastructure and Minister of Science and Technology, and later Minister of Education, Culture and Sport, whilst Yossi Sarid was named Minister of the Environment and Yair Tzaban was named Minister of Immigrant Absorption.

After the 1996 elections, in which Meretz lost a quarter of its seats, Aloni lost an internal leadership election to Yossi Sarid and retired, and the three parties decided to officially merge into a single entity by 1997. Although Shinui leader Amnon Rubinstein supported the merger, most Shinui members rejected it; once the merger became effective, part of Shinui (under the leadership of Rubinstein) broke away to participate in the merger, while the party mainstream elected Avraham Poraz as the new party leader and re-established Shinui as an independent movement. Later in the Knesset session, David Zucker also left the party to sit as an independent MK.

1999–2009
The 1999 Meretz leadership election saw Yossi Sarid reelected as party leader. The election was held through a vote of delegates to the party's convention. The vote took place in advance of the 1999 Knesset election.

The 1999 elections saw the party regain its former strength, picking up 10 seats, including the first-ever female Israeli Arab MK, Hussniya Jabara, while Shinui (now effectively led by TV celebrity journalist Tommy Lapid, although Poraz remained its formal leader) won six seats. Meretz were invited into Ehud Barak's coalition, with Sarid becoming Education Minister, Ran Cohen Minister of Industry and Trade and Haim Oron Minister of Agriculture and Rural Development. However, after Likud leader Ariel Sharon beat Barak in a special Prime Ministerial election in 2001, Meretz left the government.

On 22 October 2002, Meretz MK Uzi Even made history by becoming the first openly gay Member of Knesset, after Amnon Rubinstein retired. This created a vacancy and Even was next on the Meretz list. His term lasted less than three months, however, as the Knesset was dissolved in January 2003. Even's entry to the Knesset was met by mixed reactions from the ultra-Orthodox parties; Shas's Nissim Ze'ev was the harshest, saying Even "symbolized the bestialization of humanity", adding that he should be "hidden under the carpet" and banned from entering the Knesset.

For the 2003 elections, Meretz were joined by Roman Bronfman's Democratic Choice. However, the party shrank in representation again, this time to just six seats. Sarid immediately took responsibility and resigned from leadership, though he did not retire from the Knesset and continued serving as an MK, before stepping down prior to the 2006 elections.

In December 2003, Meretz was disbanded, in order to merge with Yossi Beilin's non-parliamentary Shahar movement. The original name suggested for the new party was Ya'ad (Goal), but was not used because it sounded like the Russian word for poison ("yad"), and it was feared that it might alienate Israel's one million Russian-speaking voters (although there had been two parties previously in Israel using the name – Ya'ad and Ya'ad – Civil Rights Movement, the latter ironically a forerunner of Meretz, they both existed before large-scale immigration from the Soviet Union). Instead, the name Yachad (Hebrew: יח"ד) was chosen. As well as meaning "Together", it is also a Hebrew acronym for Social-Democratic Israel (Hebrew: , Yisrael Hevratit Demokratit).

The new party was established in order to unite and resuscitate the Israeli Zionist peace camp, which had been soundly defeated in the 2003 elections (dropping from 56 Knesset members in 1992 to 24 in 2003) following the Al-Aqsa Intifada. The party's purpose was to unite a variety of dovish Zionist movements with the dovish wing of the Labor Party. However, the efforts were largely unsuccessful as, except for the original Meretz, Shahar and Democratic Choice, no other movement joined the new party. It has suffered from declining popular interest in left-wing peace movements, and only 20,000 people are now registered members of the party, half the number who were prior to the 1999 party primaries.

In March 2004, Yossi Beilin was elected party leader, beating Ran Cohen, and started a two-year term as the first chairman of Yachad. In July 2005, the party decided to change its name to Meretz-Yachad, because opinion polls revealed that the name Yachad was not recognisable to the Israeli public and that they preferred the old name Meretz. The chairman Beilin opposed the motion to revert the name to Meretz and a compromise between the old and new names, Meretz-Yachad, was agreed upon.

However, in the 2006 election campaign, the party dropped the Yachad part of its name, running as just Meretz, under the slogan "Meretz on the left, the Human in the centre". Nevertheless, it failed to stop the party's decline, as they won just five seats. In 2007, Tsvia Greenfeld, sixth on the party list, became the first-ever female ultra-Orthodox Knesset member, following Yossi Beilin's decision to retire from politics.

In March 2008, internal elections for the chairman of the party were held. At an early stage, Yossi Beilin, Zehava Gal-On and Ran Cohen announced their bids. After Haim Oron announced his bid in December 2007, Beilin withdrew his bid and announced his support for him. Oron went on to win the internal elections held on 18 March 2008 with 54.5% of the vote, beating Ran Cohen (27.1%) and Zehava Gal-On (18.1%) to become Meretz's new chairman.

On 22 December 2008, Meretz finalized its merger with Hatnua HaHadasha ("The New Movement") for the 2009 Israeli elections.

2009–present

The joint Meretz–Hatnua HaHadasha list ended up winning only 3 seats in the election. This electoral loss was largely attributed to traditionally left-wing voters choosing to strategically vote for Kadima, in an effort to get Tzipi Livni to head the next government, instead of Benjamin Netanyahu of Likud.

Following the party's failure in the 2009 legislative elections, some of the party members called for the resignation of the party chairman Haim Oron and to give way for Zehava Gal-On. Haim Oron indeed left the Knesset on 23 March 2011 and later left the chairmanship of the party. As a result, MKs Zehava Gal-On, Ilan Gilon, and youth activist Ori Ophir began campaigning to win the position of the party chairman. The primaries were held on 7 February 2012 for the position of the party's chairman; Gal-On was elected as the chairman with 60.6% of the votes, whilst Ilan Gilon was second with 36.6%, and Uri Ofir was third with 2.8%.

In the 2013 legislative election Meretz received 4.5% of the national vote, winning six seats.

On 8 December 2014, Meretz signed a surplus-vote agreement with the Labor Party for the upcoming 2015 legislative election, the latter set to contest the election as the Zionist Union. On 19 January 2015, Meretz held its primaries at a meeting of its 1,000-member central committee in the Tel Aviv Convention Center: Zehava Gal-On was re-elected party leader, whilst MK Nitzan Horowitz chose not to stand for re-election.

In 2015, as preliminary results of the Knesset elections indicated that the party representation would be reduced, Zehava Gal-On announced that she would resign as chairperson of Meretz as soon as a successor was chosen, and from the Knesset, in order to open a place for Tamar Zandberg, the party's fifth place-candidate who appeared to have lost her seat. Zandberg, Ilan Gilon, and others urged Gal-On to reconsider her decision. However, once absentee and soldier ballots were counted, Meretz gained a fifth seat, negating the premise for Gal-On's earlier announcement, and she announced that she would continue as party leader, saying: "Meretz received a fifth seat from young supporters, from Israeli soldiers, who raised the party's rate of support. That allowed Meretz to maintain its strength in terms of the number of voters – some 170,000 – compared with the last election. Under the circumstances, and against all odds, that is a success."

Tamar Zandberg became the leader of Meretz in 2018. In February 2019, Meretz held its first-ever open primary contest. Eighty-six percent of party members cast votes. Ilan Gilon won first place; he will be placed second on the party's Knesset slate, behind party leader Tamar Zandberg. Michal Rozin came in second place, followed by Issawi Frej and Ali Salalha. In the April 2019 elections, the party won four seats.

In July 2019 Meretz agreed to form an electoral union with Ehud Barak's Israel Democratic Party and breakaway Labor MK Stav Shaffir for the September elections, a decision ratified on 29 July. The alliance won five seats, three of them going to Meretz. Prior to the March 2020 elections, the party joined an alliance with Labor and Gesher, which won seven seats, three of them held by Meretz.

After winning six seats in the March 2021 elections, Meretz joined a coalition government alongside Yesh Atid, Blue and White, Yamina, the Labor Party, Yisrael Beiteinu, New Hope and the United Arab List. Three Meretz MKs became ministers, with Horowitz becoming Minister of Health, Zandberg Minister of Environmental Protection and Issawi Frej Minister of Regional Cooperation. This is the first time Meretz has returned to government since 2000.

The party did not win any seats in the 2022 elections under the leadership of returning chairwoman Zehava Gal-On, missing the electoral threshold by 3,800 votes, marking the first time that the party did not retain Knesset seats in an election.

Ideology
Meretz is positioned on the left-wing on the political spectrum. It is a social-democratic, and Left Zionist party, that supports green politics, progressive and egalitarian policies, and secularism. The party also supports two-state solution. 

In addition to being a full member of Socialist International and the Progressive Alliance, it has participated in Global Greens conferences. In the international media, Meretz has been described as left-wing, social-democratic, dovish, secular, civil libertarian and anti-occupation.

Meretz petitioned the 2018 Nation-State Bill and petitioned the Supreme Court of Israel to invalidate the legislation, arguing it was discriminatory against Arabs and the Druze.

Stated principles
The party emphasises the following principles (not necessarily in order of importance):
 Peace between Israel and the Palestinians, based on a two-state solution, as laid out in the Geneva Accord
 Freezing construction of the Israeli settlements in the West Bank
 Human rights issues:
Struggle for the protection of human rights in the Israeli-occupied territories
Rights of minorities in Israel (such as Israeli Arabs and foreign workers), fight against discrimination and support for affirmative action
Egalitarianism
LGBT rights
 Struggle for social justice:
Making Israel a social-democratic welfare state.
Protecting workers' rights and fighting against their exploitation (especially, though not exclusively, in the case of foreign workers and immigrants).
 Separation of religion and state and religious freedom for non-Jewish faith
 Liberal education
 Israel's security
 Environmentalism

Leaders

Leadership election process
Shulamit Aloni became the party's leader in 1992 not by a formal leadership election, but instead by a consensus of the party's founding leaders. After her 1996 retirement as leader, the party held its 1996 leadership election, for which the electorate was the membership of its Party Council. The party's 1999 leadership election saw a broader electorate, with the delegates of the Party Convention voting for its leader. In the 2004 leadership election, the party again expanded its leadership election elecotrate, opening the leadership vote up to the party's general membership. More than 15,000 party members participated in this leadership election. The 2012 leadership election saw a return to limiting the elecotrate to party convention delegates. In the 2018 leadership election, voting was re-opened to the party's general membership, before being closed for the 2019 leadership election, and later re-opened in 2022.

Election results

Knesset members

Meretz supporters abroad
A number of left-wing Zionist organizations that share many of the ideas of Meretz are affiliated with the Israel-based World Union of Meretz, which is an ideological faction within the World Zionist Organization; this includes the London-based Meretz UK, France's Cercle Bernard Lazare and the USA's Partners for Progressive Israel. The World Union of Meretz has representation in other organizations, including the Jewish National Fund.

Hashomer Hatzair, a progressive Zionist youth movement with branches in many countries, is informally associated with Meretz; it had previously been affiliated with Mapam.

American Jewish comedian Sarah Silverman, whose sister Susan moved from the US to Israel and is a Reform rabbi there, asked Israeli voters to choose Meretz in the 2015 election.

See also
 2018 Meretz leadership election
 2019 Meretz leadership election
 2022 Meretz leadership election
 Peace Now
 Young Meretz
 Meretz Youth
 Partners for Progressive Israel

References

External links

Official website 
Official platform, 02/2021 
 
 
 
Knesset Websites: Meretz (12–15th Knesset), Meretz-Democratic Choice-Shahar (16th Knesset), Meretz-Yahad (17th Knesset), New Movement-Meretz (18th Knesset)

 
1992 establishments in Israel
Feminist political parties in Israel
Full member parties of the Socialist International
Green political parties in Israel
Labor Zionism
Parties related to the Party of European Socialists
Political parties established in 1992
Political parties in Israel
Progressive Alliance
Secularism in Israel
Social democratic parties in Israel
Zionist political parties in Israel